Anordrin (former developmental code name AF-53), also known as 2α,17α-diethynyl-A-nor-5α-androstane-2β,17β-diol dipropionate, is a synthetic, steroidal selective estrogen receptor modulator (SERM) which is used in China as an emergency contraceptive. It is the most commonly used emergency contraceptive in China. The drug is marketed in a combination formulation with mifepristone under the brand name Zi Yun. Anordrin has not been studied for use or marketed outside of China. It has been used in China since the 1970s.

Anordrin has both weak estrogenic and antiestrogenic activity. It binds to the estrogen receptor but does not bind to the androgen receptor or the progesterone receptor. In animals, anordrin has antigonadotropic effects, and in male animals, inhibits spermatogenesis and causes atrophy of the epididymis, prostate, and seminal vesicles. It produces a dihydroxylated active metabolite, anordiol, with similar but more potent estrogenic activity. The abortifacient effects of anordrin in animals are blocked by supplemental estradiol, suggesting that it is acting as an antiestrogen rather than an estrogen to exert its emergency contraceptive effects.

See also
 List of selective estrogen receptor modulators

References

Ethynyl compounds
Androstanes
Propionate esters
Selective estrogen receptor modulators
Synthetic estrogens